Valtellina or the Valtelline (occasionally spelled as two words in English: Val Telline; ;  or ;) is a valley in the Lombardy region of northern Italy, bordering Switzerland. Today it is known for its ski center, hot spring spas, bresaola, cheeses (in particular Bitto, named after the river Bitto) and wines. In past centuries it was a key alpine pass between northern Italy and Germany and control of the Valtellina was much sought after, particularly during the Thirty Years' War as it was an important part of the Spanish Road.

Geography
The most important comune of the valley is Sondrio; the others major centers are Aprica, Morbegno, Tirano, Bormio and Livigno. Although Livigno is on the northern side of the alpine watershed, it is considered part of Valtellina as it falls within the province of Sondrio.

History

Antiquity and the middle ages
The region was conquered in 16 BC by the Romans.  By the 5th century it was Christianized with around ten pieve (rural churches with a baptistery) under the Diocese of Como.  The Lombards gained control over the area after 720, but about fifty years later Charlemagne gave the valley to Saint Denis Monastery near Paris.  Later the valley returned to the Bishop of Como.

Early modern period

During the 16th, 17th and 18th centuries, the Valtellina belonged to the Three Leagues (the "Grey Leagues"), which was then a mutual-defense region independent of Switzerland but is now the easternmost Swiss Canton of Graubünden. Graubünden is an area in which German, Romansh, Lombard and Italian are all spoken, and hence during 16th century rule by Graubünden, the region became known variously as Veltlin, Westtirol (West Tyrol), and the Welsche Vogteien ("Romanic Bailiwicks").

During the Thirty Years' War, the Valtellina was a theater of intense military and diplomatic struggle among France, the Habsburg powers and the local authorities which culminated in the Valtellina war of 1620–1626. Control over the routes through the Valtellina to the passes between Lombardy and the Danube watershed was at stake as it formed part of the so-called Spanish Road. The anti-Habsburg forces in the Three Leagues put together a court named 'clerical overseers' that between 1618 and 1620 handed down a number of convictions (often in absentia) against Catholics in the Leagues and Valtellina. This included the arresting under false pretenses and torturing to death of the (catholic) arch-priest Nicolò Rusca of Sondrio. This and similar harsh judgments of the anti-Habsburg Thusis court led to a conspiracy to drive the Protestants out of the valley. The leader of the conspiracy, Giacomo Robustelli of the Planta family, had ties to Madrid, Rome and Paris. On the evening of 18/19 July 1620, a force of Valtellina rebels supported by Austrian and Italian troops marched into Tirano and began killing Protestants. When they finished in Tirano, they marched to Teglio, Sondrio and further down the valley killing every Protestant that they found. Between 500 and 600 people were killed on that night and in the following four days. The attack drove nearly all the Protestants out of the valley, prevented further Protestant incursions and took the Valtellina out of the Three Leagues. The killings in Valtellina were part of the conflicts in Graubünden known as the Bündner Wirren or Confusion of the Leagues.

In February 1623 France, Savoy, and Venice signed the Treaty of Paris in which all three signatories agreed to re-establish the territory of Valtellina by attempting to remove Spanish forces stationed there.

18th and 19th centuries
In 1797 the growing power of the First French Republic created the Cisalpine republic in Northern Italy. On 10 October 1797, the French supported a revolt in the Valtellina against the Graubünden (Grisons in French and English), and it joined the Cisalpine Republic.

After the Congress of Vienna in 1815 the Valtellina became part of the Kingdom of Lombardy–Venetia, which was a constituent land of the Austrian Empire. In 1859 it came, together with Lombardy, to the Kingdom of Sardinia, and finally in 1861 it became part of the Kingdom of Italy.

At the end of the 19th century there was substantial migration out of the Valtellina for reasons of the prevailing economically depressed conditions of the region and for young men to avoid conscription. Australia, especially Western Australia, was a popular destination for such migrants.

Industrially, the area is famous as the home of the world's first mainline electrified railway. The electrification of the Ferrovia della Valtellina took place in 1902, using three-phase power at 3,600 V, with a maximum speed of 70 km/h. The system was designed by the brilliant Hungarian engineer Kálmán Kandó who was employed by main contractors the Budapest-based Ganz company.

Mussolini and the Valtellina Redoubt

During the last months of World War II, the Italian dictator Benito Mussolini and other diehard fascist leaders of the Italian Social Republic (RSI) proposed making a "last stand" against the advancing Allied armies in the Valtellina. The Fascist Party secretary Alessandro Pavolini was the main proponent of the idea, which he first raised with Mussolini in September 1944. He pointed out that the valley was ringed with fortifications dating from World War I, and had its own electricity generating capacity (hydroelectric). In the last months of 1944 Mussolini's government began moving munitions and food stores to the area. By January 1945, however, no firm decision to make a stand in the Valtellina had been taken. The Germans, represented by Ambassador Rudolf Rahn, were opposed to the idea. In March, with the Allies advancing into the Po valley, Mussolini's Cabinet again discussed the idea. The RSI's military commander, Marshal Rodolfo Graziani, who believed the war was already lost, opposed the plan. This ensured that no serious military preparations were made.

In early April Pavolini again raised the plan, which he called "the Epic of the 50,000," claiming that 50,000 Blackshirts would follow Mussolini if he made a stand in the Valtellina. The Germans, who by this time were negotiating with the Allies to surrender their armies in Italy, remained adamantly opposed. Filippo Anfuso, the RSI's under-secretary for foreign affairs, pointed out that valley was already mostly in the hands of the partisans. By mid April, the Valtellina plan was no longer a realistic possibility. Although Mussolini continued to fantasise about dying a heroic death there, the plan had no serious support. When Mussolini left Milan on 25 April, heading north, it was assumed he was going to the Valtellina, but his intentions were never made clear. He told some people he would go to Bolzano, in the province of Bolzano, to join up with German forces. In any event, Mussolini's capture on 27 April by the partisans at Dongo, barely short of the Valtellina, ended any possibility of a fascist last stand.

Culture and language
The local dialect used to be a mix of Romansch and Lombard language. These days, however, only Italian and the Valtellinese variety of Lombard are spoken.

Folklore

L'è foeu el sginer & l'è foeu l'ors de la tana 
On January 31st there was the tradition of l'è foeu el sginer ("January's out"), a custom very similar to that celebrated on February 2 known as l'è foeu l'ors de la tana ("the bear is out from its den"). Both celebrated the end of winter and the imminent arrival of spring. The two customs involved walking around the town and inviting people to leave their house under any pretext, like throwing a large piece of wood or a pot down the stairs. When people ran outside to check what had happened, they were greeted with the shout l'è foeu el sginer! or l'è foeu l'ors de la tana!

Intraverser l’ann 
Intraverser l'èn or intraverser l'ann (literally "to put the year across") also celebrated New Year's Eve: during the night young people used to build barricades of gates, doors, benches, agricultural tools, logs, stairs, sledges, and carts in the main square or in front of the church, to prevent the old year from leaving. The next morning, the owners of the stolen objects had to go and recover them, dismantling the barricade and metaphorically opening up the way to the new year.

The gabinat 
On January 6, the custom of the gabinat is still celebrated today, especially in Tirano, in the Upper Valley, and in the nearby Poschiavo Valley (Switzerland) Traditionally, children would suddenly enter other people's homes shouting gabinat! and in exchange, they would receive a handful of cooked chestnuts, some sweets or dried fruit. The adults competed to precede the other in exclaiming gabinat when they met. Whoever lost had to pay a pledge; often, the prize at stake was established in advance and the gabinat thus became the object of bets. In order to win, various strategies were adopted: stalking, disguises, fake illnesses ... Nowadays, it's only the childrean who do the gabinat, and they usually show up to relatives, friends, and local shopkeepers.

The custom of the gabinat most likely comes from Bavaria, Germany, where Christmas, New Year's Eve and Epiphany were indicated with the name Geb-nacht (Gaben means "gifts" and Nacht means "night", therefore "night of gifts"): on the eve of these holidays, the poor young people sang in front of the doors of the wealthiest in the hope to receive a gift.

Andà a ciamà l'erba (Let's go call the grass) 
On the first of March, throughout Valtellina and Valchiavenna, people used to go to ciamà l'erba ("call the grass"). The children walked in the meadows making noise with cowbells to call the grass and awaken it from the winter slumber. This custom also served to propitiate a bountiful harvest.

The Carneval vegg (Old Carnival) 
In the village of Grosio, the Carnival is celebrated, unlike the rest of Valtellina, on the first Sunday of Lent, according to the Ambrosian calendar in force before the Gregorian reform. For this reason, it is called Carneval vegg ("Old Carnival").

In the past, it was customary for people to gather all together to dance, sing, eat and drink. Being an agricultural ritual that represents the death of winter and the beginning of summer, Carnival officially began on January 17 with the parade of the blessed cattle adorned with coloured ribbons. It included numerous bonfires, with which the paths were cleared to facilitate the passage of farmers, their agricultural vehicles and their livestock. A straw puppet with horns on his head representing the Carnival was also burnt.

Nowadays, the districts of the towns challenge each other to the sound of allegorical floats, and the parade is attended by traditional masks, eight characters representing traditions, past events, and moments of everyday life: the Old Carnival, a bearded and joyful man dressed as a mountaineer, and Lean Lent, a thin woman dressed in a humble way, with a dark handkerchief on her head and an empty basket on her arm, represent the transition from the glories of Carnival to Lenten fasts. They are accompanied by the Paralytic, the Bear Handler, a funny shepherd who dances and rolls on the ground named Toni, an old man with the butt covered with Nutella, a hunchbacked mountaineer whose hump is filled with chestnut urchins, and Bernarda, a man disguised as a baby put in a pannier supported by a fake old woman, and accompanied by another man dressed as a farmer).

During the Carnival period, manzòli or manzòla, white flour and buckwheat pancakes mixed with slices of cheese and cut into the shape of a calf were eaten to propitiate the abundance of livestock parts.

The Carneval di Mat (Carnival of the fools) 
In Bormio, during the day of the Carnival of the Fools, the Mayor hands over his power to the Podestà di Mat (Podestà of the Fools) to Harlequin, and to the Compagnia di Mat ("the Company of the Fools") who give a public reading of the gossip and complaints that citizens have deposited in a box placed in the square of the Kuerc. The festival also includes a parade along the streets of the historic centre led by the Harlequins of the Company of Mat, with children escorting the Podestà.

La coscrizione (the conscription) 
The conscription was originally a celebration on the occasion of the call to the draft: the tradition seems to have originated in the second half of the nineteenth century with the unification of Italy when young men were forced to serve a period in the Army. The feast of the conscripts of eighteen-year-olds was therefore a kind of rite of passage to adulthood. Today is simply the celebration of the coming of age.

The duration of the celebration varied from town to town: in Grosio the conscription could last up to ten days, during which the boys and girls met in bars, taverns, or in places specially set up for the purpose. The conscripts had the task of embroidering on the tricolour flag the symbol and possibly the motto that the group had chosen. On the walls of the villages, it was customary to write W LA CLASSE... ("cheers to the year...") followed by the year of birth: nowadays, conscripts hang a tricolour banner with the same wording and the names (or nicknames) of the members of the group.

The feast of the conscripts is particularly felt in Alta Valtellina: in Grosio, for a week, the conscripts meet in a club to celebrate and travel through the streets of the town in a car from which the flag decorated with the symbol of the group waves. On New Year's Eve, amid fireworks and the noise of whistles, cowbells, motorcycles, and tractors, they entrust the flag to conscripts one year younger, after having it blessed in church. Each group chooses different coloured sweatshirts and decorates the tricolour with a symbol that represents the group's motto or identity.

I Pasquali 
The Pasquali are allegorical floats with a religious theme, prepared during the winter by the various districts of Bormio (Buglio, Combo, Dossiglio, Dossorovina and Maggiore) for Easter (Pasqua meaning Easter in Italian). On Easter day, the Pasquali are carried on the shoulders of the boys and are accompanied by a band, folk groups, women, seniors, and children who embellish the parade with flowers and other small crafts. Everyone wears the traditional red, black and white costume. After having followed the entire Via Roma and upon arrival at the Piazza del Kuerc (the main square of the town) the ancient bell called Bajona starts tolling and a jury draws up a ranking of the best Pasquali. At the end of the parade, the floats are exhibited in Piazza del Kuerc where they stay until Easter Monday.

Il Palio delle Contrade 
Born in 1963, the Palio delle Contrade sees the inhabitants of the five districts of Bormio compete against each other, divided according to age, in downhill, cross-country, combined, and relay races. The cross-country race takes place through the streets of the town, covered with snow for the purpose.

Wines

In Valtellina, wines are produced mainly from Chiavennasca (the local name of Nebbiolo grape variety) with other minor varieties such as Rossola nera permitted up to 20% for the Denominazione di origine controllata (DOC) and 10% for the Denominazione di Origine Controllata e Garantita (DOCG). Grapes are limited to a harvest yield of 12 tonnes per hectare. The finished wine must be aged for at least two years prior to release (three years if a Riserva bottling) with a minimum alcohol level of at least 11%. Yields for the DOCG wines are further restricted to a maximum of 8 tonnes/ha. While the aging requirements are the same as the DOC, the minimum alcohol level for the DOCG wine is 12%.

The best-known villages for red wines are: Grumello, Sassella, Inferno, Valgella, and Maroggia. The village names are normally indicated on the label. Additionally there is an Amarone style DOCG wine called Sforzato (Sfursat).

Tourism 
One of the most notable tourist attractions of the area is the Bernina Line (“Trenino Rosso”) of the Rhaetian Railway, which links the town of Tirano in the Valtellina with St. Moritz in Graubünden, Switzerland via the Bernina Pass. The mountains of the Valtellina offer numerous possibilities for sport activities: skiing and winter sports in Bormio, Aprica or Livigno, hiking and biking in the same locations and especially in the secondary valleys, and rock climbing in the Val Masino.

The Rupe Magna, a unique large rock with more than 5,000 engraved figures dating from between the 4th and 1st millennia BCE, can be found at the Rock Engraving Park in Grosio.

Val Poschiavo
In the lower part of the Val Poschiavo, the valley in the Graubünden canton of Switzerland that descends into the Valtellina at Tirano, similar wines are produced - but under different regulations such as appellation and the allowance of sugar addition, or chaptalization.

Notable people 
Born in Valtellina:

 Achille Compagnoni (Mountaineer)
 Deborah Compagnoni (Alpine skier)
 Arianna Fontana (Short track speed skater)
 Marco De Gasperi (Athlete, Skyrunner)
 Fabio Meraldi (Ski mountaineer)
 Giuseppe Piazzi (Priest, mathematician and astronomer)
 Giulio Tremonti (Politician)
 Luigi Torelli (Patriot)

See also

 Valtellina disaster

References
Further reading: F Pieth: Bündnergeschichte, 1982,

External links
 An extensive history of the Valtellina area
 Tourist information

Valleys of the Alps
Valleys of Lombardy
Geographical, historical and cultural regions of Italy
Wine regions of Italy
Wine regions of Switzerland